The Last Sign is a 2005 Canadian-British-French drama film directed by Douglas Law.

Cast
 Andie MacDowell as Kathy MacFarlane
 Samuel Le Bihan as Marc
 Tim Roth as Jeremy MacFarlane
 Margot Kidder as Endora
 Mimi Kuzyk as Isabel
 Tyler Hynes as Frank
 Douglas Law as Douglas Law

References

External links 

2005 drama films
2005 films
Canadian drama films
British drama films
French drama films
English-language Canadian films
English-language French films
2000s English-language films
2000s Canadian films
2000s British films
2000s French films